The Bologna declaration (in full, Joint Declaration of the European Ministers of Education convened in Bologna on 19 June 1999) is the main guiding document of the Bologna process. It was adopted by ministers of education of 29 European countries at their meeting in Bologna in 1999.

It proposed a European Higher Education Area in which students and graduates could move freely between countries, using prior qualifications in one country as acceptable entry requirements for further study in another.

The principal aims agreed were:

 "Adoption of a system of easily readable and comparable degrees".  That is to say, countries should adopt common terminology and standards
 "Adoption of a system essentially based on two main cycles, undergraduate and graduate. Access to the second cycle [graduate education] shall require successful completion of first cycle lasting a minimum of three years. The degree awarded after the first cycle shall also be relevant to the European labour market as an appropriate level of qualification. The second cycle should lead to the master and/or doctorate degree as in many European countries."

The Bergen meeting subsequently refined the second point, and produced a three-cycle framework of qualifications, which in the UK terminology (adopted, at least partially, by many European countries) would be Bachelor for a first degree of three years, Master  for subsequent study, and Doctor for a degree which has "made a contribution through original research that extends the frontier of knowledge by developing a substantial body of work".

The Bologna declaration has later been followed up a series of meetings between EU ministers. Each meeting has produced a communiqué based on their deliberations. To date these include the Prague communiqué (2001), the Berlin communiqué (2003), the Bergen communiqué (2005), the London communiqué (2007), the Leuven & Louvain-la-Neuve communiqué (2009).

European Commission has published ( European Communities, Feb. 2009) an "ECTS Users’ Guide", including one "Overview of national regulations (...)" and "Status of the proclamation".

The Bologna Ministerial Anniversary Conference 2010 in Budapest and Vienna was held in March 2010. It issued the Budapest-Vienna Declaration.

The communiqués indicate that progress is being made towards the Bologna Declaration's aim of a European Higher Education Area, however such an area is not universally accepted as being a desirable outcome.

According to the Budapest-Vienna declaration, the next Ministerial Meeting was held in Bucharest on 26–27 April 2012.

References

External links
London 2007 website
Students' view
ECTS Users’ Guide - Office for Official Publications of the European Communities, European Commission
full text of the Bologna Declaration

Educational assessment and evaluation
Educational policies and initiatives of the European Union
Declarations of the European Union

de:Bologna-Erklärung
nl:Bolognaverklaring